RAK Ceramics P.J.S.C is the largest ceramics manufacturer in the world. Headquartered in the emirate of Ras Al Khaimah in the United Arab Emirates, RAK Ceramics has an annual production capacity of 110 million square metres of tiles, 5 million pieces of sanitaryware, 24 million pieces of porcelain tableware and 600,000 pieces of faucets. The company employs 15,000 people across its operations in the UAE, India, Bangladesh, Iran, Europe, Australia, East Africa, and Singapore.

RAK Ceramics specializes in ceramic and gres porcelain wall and floor tiles, sanitaryware, kitchen sinks, including faucets for walls, floors, bathrooms and kitchens.

RAK Ceramics has ten tile plants, two sanitaryware plants and one plant each for faucets and tableware at its headquarters in RAK, as well as overseas plants in India, Bangladesh and Iran.

In June 2014, Samena Capital bought a 30.6% stake of the business. Samena Capital is an Asia, India and MENA-focused alternative investments group, co-established in 2008 by Shirish Saraf and key partners from a cross section of industries and regions.

RAK Ceramics is a publicly listed company on the Abu Dhabi Securities Exchange in the United Arab Emirates and on the Dhaka Stock Exchange in Bangladesh and as a group the company has an annual turnover of approximately US$1 billion.

History
RAK Ceramics was established in Ras Al Khaimah in 1989 by Sheikh Saud Bin Saqr Al Qasimi, member of the Supreme Council and Ruler of Ras Al Khaimah.

In 1993 RAK Ceramics opened of its first sanitaryware plant in Ras Al Khaimah

By the year 2000, the company had opened its first overseas plant in Bangladesh.

From 2000 to 2004, RAK Ceramics invested heavily, expanding the company, and exporting to almost 120 countries by 2004. In 2010 RAK Ceramics becomes the world’s largest ceramics manufacturer and by 2012, RAK Ceramics had supplied 1 billion square metres of tiles to projects around the world since the company began.

In June 2014, the board agreed to sell a 30.6% equity stake to Samena Capital on a proprietary basis. Given the size of the transaction, Samena Capital formed a consortium of co-investors which included two GCC sovereign wealth funds, a blue-chip Saudi family and existing high net worth shareholders.

Ownership
The largest shareholder of RAK Ceramics is now Falcon Investments with a 20.4% stake in the business. Other shareholders include Al Rajhi Partners LLC; the Government of Ras Al Khaimah;etc.

Affiliates abroad
In addition to its production facilities in Ras Al Khaimah, RAK Ceramics operates plants in Bangladesh, India and Iran. In August 2015 the company acquired the remaining 20% minority share of its Iran facility, making RAK Iran a wholly owned subsidiary of RAK Ceramics. In October 2015 the company acquired the remaining 8% minority share of its India facility, making RAK India a wholly owned subsidiary of RAK Ceramics.

In 2015 RAK Ceramics focused on acquisitions aimed at strengthening the control of the Group over its subsidiaries, acquiring 100% of its subsidiaries in Iran and India, and in early 2016 RAK Ceramics acquired the remaining shares in its subsidiaries in the UK, Italy, Germany and Australia.

In 2017 RAK Ceramics has made a Joint Venture in Morbi, India with GRYPHON Ceramics. RAK Ceramics holds 51% stakes in GRYPHON along with the other local partners. In Gryphon they are making large format porcelain slabs. The company started producing big slabs in February, 2019,

Materials and technology
Raw materials are sourced locally (sand, quartz and feldspar) as well as from all over the world (kaolin, ball clay and feldspar).

A wide range of technologies are used at the company’s plants some of which include digital printing technology, continua+, chroma, slim, anti-microbial, glow in the dark, double charge, roll feed and other technologies.

Products
In tiles RAK Ceramics offers one of the largest collections of ceramic wall and floor tiles, gres porcelain and super-sized slabs in the industry. Offering more than 6,000 production models, tiles are manufactured in a variety of sizes, from the smallest 10x10cm up to the largest in the region at 135x305cm, the widest range offered in the ceramics field.

RAK Porcelain offers porcelain tableware for the hotel, restaurant and hospitality segment. Its products are now supplied to over 40,000 star-rated hotels across more than 165 countries with customers including J W Marriott, Hilton, Hyatt, and Sheraton amongst others.

Labour
Since its creation in 1989, RAK Ceramics has provided employment for approximately 6,000 Asian migrant workers. At present, around 8,000 employees work for the company in the UAE and a total of 15,000 worldwide.

The company employs staff from all over the world including the UAE, Lebanon, India, Bangladesh, Philippines, China, Sudan, Egypt, Morocco, Armenia, Syria, Italy, Switzerland, the Netherlands, Germany, UK, and other countries at the headquarters in Ras Al Khaimah.

References
3. Ceramic industry make to double turnover by 2021 

Ceramics manufacturers of the United Arab Emirates
Manufacturing companies established in 1989
Companies based in the Emirate of Ras Al Khaimah
Emirati companies established in 1989